Louis Henri Laverne (4 June 1868 – 30 December 1901) was a French sailor who competed in the 1900 Summer Olympics in Meulan, France.

Further reading

References

External links

1868 births
1901 deaths
French male sailors (sport)
Sailors at the 1900 Summer Olympics – 1 to 2 ton
Olympic sailors of France
Olympic bronze medalists for France
Olympic medalists in sailing
Medalists at the 1900 Summer Olympics
Sportspeople from Paris
Sailors at the 1900 Summer Olympics – Open class